David Bolstorff is an American football coach.  He was the head football coach at Waldorf College in Forest City, Iowa, serving from 1965 to 2006, compiling a record of 189-184-2

References

Year of birth missing (living people)
Living people
Waldorf Warriors football coaches
People from Forest City, Iowa